The Rangpur Riders are a franchise cricket team based in Rangpur, Bangladesh, which plays in the Bangladesh Premier League (BPL). They are one of the seven teams that are competing in the 2016 Bangladesh Premier League. The team is being captained by Naeem Islam. 
Prior to the fourth season, the ownership of the Riders were transferred to Sohana Sports. The team rearranged its playing squad, with Shahid Afridi, Soumya Sarkar, Mohammad Shehzad and many other acclaimed cricketers. Shakib Al Hasan, the icon player from the previous edition was transferred to Dhaka Dynamites. The club made headlines with acquisition of Shane Watson, David Miller and Anwar Ali. 

The Riders started the season strong with a dominating victory against Chittagong Vikings, winning the match by 9 wickets with Mohammad Shehzad scoring 80 runs. The team continued its domination during its second game, getting Khulna Titans all out for 44, the lowest ever total in Bangladesh Premier League.

Player draft
The 2016 BPL draft was held on 30 September. Prior to the draft, the seven clubs signed 38 foreign players to contracts and each existing franchise was able to retain two home-grown players from the 2015 season. A total 301 players participated in the draft, including 133 local and 168 foreign players. 85 players were selected in the draft.

Player transfers
Prior to the 2016 draft, a number of high-profile players moved teams. These included transfers between competing teams and due to the suspension of the signing of Shahid Afridi as team captain of Rangpur Riders from the Sylhet Super Stars and Shakib Al Hasan as team captain of Dhaka Dynamites from Rangpur Riders.

Standings

 The top four teams will qualify for playoffs
  advanced to the Qualifier
  advanced to the Eliminator

Current squad

Overall records

References 

Bangladesh Premier League
Rangpur Riders